Anatoly Vassilievich Danilov — (born on October 7, 1954, in village Toganash Krasnochetaysky District, Chuvashia, Russia) — Chuvash painter, Merited Artist of Chuvash Republic, member of the USSR painters Union (1990).

During 1980–1985 years he studied in Painting&Graphic Department of the Chuvash Pedagogic University.

Exhibitions 
He participated in regional exhibitions: in Cheboksary, Novocheboksarsk, Yoshkar-Ola, Almetyevsk (Tatarstan) and Smolensk.

Personal exhibitions in Cheboksary, Yoshkar-Ola.

Famous creative works 
 Summer. August, 1985);
 (Poet Piter Yajgeer, 1997);
 (Mother, 1998);
 (Cheboksary. Old city in winter, 1998);
 Coat&Flag of the Alikovsky District, Chuvashia.

References
 Anatoly Danilov's site (RU)
 A. Danilov's in the Chuvash State Arts museum site (RU)

1954 births
Living people
People from Chuvashia
Chuvash people
20th-century Russian painters
Russian male painters
21st-century Russian painters
20th-century Russian male artists
21st-century Russian male artists